Head Games may refer to:

Psychological one-upmanship, among other related concepts, also known as mind games
Head Games (album), a 1979 album by rock band Foreigner
Head Games (song), song from above album
Head Games (novel), a 1995 novel based on the Doctor Who television series
Head Games (game show), a 2009 television game show
Head Games, a 1993 film directed by Richard W. Haines
Head Games, a 2007 novel by Craig McDonald
Head Games, a 2012 documentary television series on Discovery Channel 
Head Games (film), a 2012 documentary film
 Head Games Publishing, a defunct game company now part of Activision